The IPCC, or Intergovernmental Panel on Climate Change, is a scientific body under the auspices of the United Nations.

IPCC may also refer to:

Other organisations
 Independent Police Complaints Commission, defunct public body in England and Wales
 Independent Police Complaints Council of the Hong Kong Government
 Irish Peatland Conservation Council, charity to preserve bogs

Other uses
 Integrated Professional Competency Course, a course of the Institute of Chartered Accountants of India
 Interworld Police Coordinating Company, a fictional organization in Jack Vance's novels